
Gmina Obrowo is a rural gmina (administrative district) in Toruń County, Kuyavian-Pomeranian Voivodeship, in north-central Poland.

Villages
Gmina Obrowo contains the villages and settlements of Bartoszewo, Brzozówka, Dobrzejewice, Dzikowo, Głogowo, Kawęczyn, Kazimierzewo, Kuźniki, Łążyn, Łążynek, Łęk-Osiek, Obory, Obrowo, Osiek, Sąsieczno, Silno, Skrzypkowo, Smogorzewiec, Stajenczynki, Szembekowo, Zawały, Zębówiec and Zębowo.

Neighbouring gminas
Gmina Obrowo is bordered by the town of Ciechocinek and by the gminas of Aleksandrów Kujawski, Ciechocin, Czernikowo, Lubicz and Wielka Nieszawka.

References

Polish official population figures 2006

Obrowo
Toruń County